Richard Irving "Dick" Stearns, III (September 4, 1927 – January 25, 2022) was an American competitive sailor and Olympic and Pan American Games medalist.

Biography
Stearns was born in Evanston, Illinois. In 1963, he won a gold medal along with Robert Halperin at the Pan American Games in Sao Paulo, Brazil, sailing Ninotchka. He also started the company Lands' End, in the Spring of 1963, with Halperin, Halperin's close friend Gary Comer, and two of Stearns' employees. He won a silver medal in the Star class at the 1964 Summer Olympics in Tokyo, together with Lynn Williams.

References

External links

1927 births
2022 deaths
People from Evanston, Illinois
American male sailors (sport)
Sailors at the 1964 Summer Olympics – Star
Olympic silver medalists for the United States in sailing
Star class world champions
Medalists at the 1964 Summer Olympics
World champions in sailing for the United States
Pan American Games medalists in sailing
Pan American Games gold medalists for the United States
Sailors at the 1963 Pan American Games
Medalists at the 1963 Pan American Games